Song Seung-min (born 11 January 1992) is a South Korean footballer who plays as striker for Chungnam Asan FC.

Career
He was selected by Gwangju FC in the 2014 K League draft.

References

External links 

1992 births
Living people
Association football forwards
South Korean footballers
Gwangju FC players
Pohang Steelers players
Chungnam Asan FC players
K League 1 players
K League 2 players